Giving may refer to:

 Gift, the transfer of something without the expectation of receiving something in return
 Generosity, the habit of giving freely without expecting anything in return
 Charity (practice), the giving of help to those in need who are not related to the giver
 Giving: How Each of Us Can Change the World, a book by Bill Clinton
 Giving (album), an album by Colm Ó Snodaigh

See also
 Alternative giving, a form of gift-giving in which the giver makes a donation to a charitable organization in the recipient's name
 GAVE (disambiguation)
 Give (disambiguation)
 Given (disambiguation)
 The Giver, a novel by Lois Lowry
 Givers, an American indie rock band